A free kick in rugby union is usually awarded to a team for a technical offence committed by the opposing side.  Free kicks are awarded for technical offences such as playing too many players in a line-out or time wasting at a scrum.  A free kick is also awarded for making a mark.

Once awarded a free kick the team must decide how they wish to play it.

 The team may opt to play a place kick, where the ball is placed on the ground by the kicker at a point designated by the referee then the player may take a run up to the ball and kick it downfield but not into touch (law 21.4 (e)). This is very rarely chosen.
 They may opt for a drop kick, where the ball starts in the player's hands and is dropped onto the ground whereupon it is kicked downfield on its upward bounce by the player.
 They may opt for a punt, where the ball starts in the player's hands and is dropped and kicked without bouncing.
 They may opt to play a tap kick.  A tap kick is played when the team feel they would benefit more from keeping possession of the ball rather than kicking it downfield.  To play a tap kick, the player either places the ball on the ground and kicks it a small distance, or punts it back into his own hands. The ball must travel a visible distance.
 They may opt to take it as a scrum.
 A team awarded a free kick at a lineout may choose a further lineout into which they throw in.

The team in possession cannot directly score a goal from the free kick itself, nor score a dropped goal until the ball has become dead or an opponent has touched the ball or tackled a ball carrier.  This also applies if the team in possession opts for a scrum. Unlike a penalty kick, if the ball goes into touch from a free kick then the kicking team enjoys no special privileges; the line-out is taken by the opposing team rather than the kicking team, and a direct kick to touch from outside the 22-metre area results in this line-out being formed opposite where the ball was kicked, not where it crossed the touch-line.

Furthermore, the defending team can attempt to charge the kick as long as they have first retreated 10m. If they prevent the kick from being taken this way, they win a scrum.

See also
 Drop kick
 Penalty
 Scrum

References

Rugby union terminology